Sam Griffiths is an Australian Eventing rider from Pearcedale in Victoria. 2017 saw him as the Ambassador to the Mitsubishi Motors Adelaide International Horse Trials. 4th individually at the 2016 Rio de Janeiro Olympic Games and part of the Bronze medal winning team. He won the 2014 Mitsubishi Motors Badminton Horse Trials riding Paulank Brockagh who he later went on to ride in the FEI World Equestrian Games.  Winner of the 2014 Event Rider of the Year L'Année Hippique Awards. At the 2012 Summer Olympics he competed in the Individual and Team eventing, but fell during the cross-country event and did not finish.  He was originally selected as the second reserve rider, but entered the team when two other Australian horses were unable to compete.  
Now based in the UK competing himself and training other riders.

CCI5* Results

Notable Horses 

 Private Colin- 1994 Bay Gelding
 2003 Asian Pacific Championships - Team Gold Medal, Individual Silver Medal
 In The Groove - 1989 Bay Irish Sport Horse Gelding
 2003 FEI World Cup Final - 19th Place
 Noble Opposition - 1997 Bay Gelding
 2004 FEI Eventing Young Horse World Championships - 17th Place
 Motion Bound - 2001 Brown Gelding (Farrington Spondulicks x Horace)
 2008 FEI Eventing Young Horse World Championships - 16th Place
 Happy Times - 1999 Bay Oldenburg Gelding (Heraldik XX x Maraschino)
 2012 London Olympic Games - Team Sixth Place
 Paulank Brockagh - 2003 Bay Irish Sport Horse Mare (Touchdown x Trigerrero)
 2014 Badminton CCI**** Winner
 2014 World Equestrian Games - Team Fourth Place, Individual 16th Place
 2016 Rio Olympics - Team Bronze Medal, Individual Fourth Place

References

External links
London 2012 profile
Australian Olympic team profile

Australian male equestrians
1972 births
Living people
Olympic equestrians of Australia
Equestrians at the 2012 Summer Olympics
Equestrians at the 2016 Summer Olympics
Olympic bronze medalists for Australia
Olympic medalists in equestrian
Medalists at the 2016 Summer Olympics
Sportsmen from Victoria (Australia)
People from Mornington Peninsula
Sportspeople from Melbourne